The Mid-Atlantic Athletic Conference (MAC) is an American high school athletic league composed of private schools in the Washington, D.C. area.  The conference was founded in 1994. Solely male teams participate in the conference.  As every member school is co-ed, the girls for all schools except Saint James compete in the Independent School League, or ISL. The MAC is often considered less competitive than the WCAC and the IAC, but more competitive than the PVAC, the three other Washington-area private high school conferences.

Member schools

Traditional Rivalries
The Potomac School vs. Flint Hill School
Sidwell Friends School vs. Georgetown Day High School
St. James School vs. St. Andrew's Episcopal School
Sidwell Friends School vs. Maret High School
Maret High School vs. St. Andrew's Episcopal School

Champions 
2004-2005 Conference Champions
Cross Country: Georgetown Day School
Football: Sidwell Friends School
Basketball: Flint Hill School
Track : Georgetown Day School
Lacrosse: The Potomac School

2004-2005 Director's Cup Winner (Overall Athletic Excellence): Sidwell Friends School

2005-2006
Football: Sidwell Friends School / St. James School
Wrestling: Sidwell Friends School
Basketball: Flint Hill School
Baseball: Sidwell Friends School
Lacrosse: The Potomac School

2005-2006 Director's Cup Winner (Overall Athletic Excellence): Sidwell Friends School

2006-2007 Conference Champions
Cross Country: The Potomac School
Football: Flint Hill School
Soccer: Sidwell Friends School
Basketball: Sidwell Friends School
Wrestling: Sidwell Friends School
Lacrosse: Sidwell Friends School / Flint Hill School / St. James School
Tennis: Flint Hill School / The Potomac School
Baseball: Maret School / Flint Hill School
Track: The Potomac School

2006-2007 Director's Cup Winner (Overall Athletic Excellence): Sidwell Friends School

2007-2008 Conference Champions
Cross Country: The Potomac School
Football: Flint Hill School
Soccer: Flint Hill School/Sidwell Friends School
Golf: St. Andrew's Episcopal School
Basketball: The Potomac School / Flint Hill School
Wrestling: Sidwell Friends School
Baseball:Flint Hill School / Maret School
Lacrosse: Flint Hill School
Tennis: Flint Hill School
Track: The Potomac School

2007-2008 Director's Cup Winner (Overall Athletic Excellence): Sidwell Friends School

2008-2009 Conference Champions
Cross Country: Sidwell Friends School
Football: Flint Hill School
Soccer: Sidwell Friends School
Golf: St. Andrew's Episcopal School
Basketball: Flint Hill School
Wrestling: Sidwell Friends School
Baseball: Maret School / Flint Hill School 
Lacrosse: Flint Hill School / The Potomac School
Tennis: The Potomac School / Sidwell Friends School/Maret School
Track: St. Andrew's Episcopal School

2008-2009 Director's Cup Winner (Overall Athletic Excellence): Sidwell Friends School

2009-2010 Conference Champions
Cross Country: Sidwell Friends School
Football: Flint Hill School
Soccer: Sidwell Friends School
Golf: St. Andrew's Episcopal School
Wrestling: Sidwell Friends School
Basketball: Sidwell Friends School / Flint Hill School
Baseball:  Flint Hill School
Lacrosse: Flint Hill School
Tennis: The Potomac School
Track: Maret School

2009-2010 Director's Cup Winner (Overall Athletic Excellence): Sidwell Friends School

2010-2011 Conference Champions
Cross-Country: Georgetown Day School
Lacrosse: The Potomac School
Track and Field: Georgetown Day School

2010-2011 Director's Cup Winner (Overall Athletic Excellence): Flint Hill School

2011-2012 Conference Champions
Cross Country: Georgetown Day School
Football: The Potomac School
Soccer: Georgetown Day School
Golf: Flint Hill School
Basketball: Sidwell Friends School
Wrestling; Sidwell Friends School
Baseball: The Potomac School / Sidwell Friends School
Lacrosse: The Potomac School
Tennis: The Potomac School
Track and Field: Georgetown Day School

2011-2012 Director's Cup Winner (Overall Athletic Excellence): The Potomac School / Sidwell Friends School

2012-2013 Conference Champions
Cross-Country: Georgetown Day School
Lacrosse: The Potomac School
Track and Field: Georgetown Day School

2012-2013 Director's Cup Winner (Overall Athletic Excellence): Flint Hill School

2013-2014 Conference Champions
Cross-Country: Georgetown Day School
Lacrosse: Flint Hill School
Wrestling: Sidwell Friends School
Basketball: Maret School 
Track and Field: Georgetown Day School

2013-2014 Director's Cup Winner (Overall Athletic Excellence): The Potomac School

2014-2015 Conference Champions
Soccer: Flint Hill School
Cross Country: Georgetown Day School
Basketball: St. Andrew's Episcopal School and Maret School
Wrestling: Sidwell Friends School
Lacrosse: The Potomac School
Track and Field: Georgetown Day School

2014-2015 Director's Cup Winner (Overall Athletic Excellence): The Potomac School

2015-2016 Conference Champions
Cross Country: Sidwell Friends School
Wrestling: Sidwell Friends School
Track and Field: Sidwell Friends School
2015-2016 Director's Cup Winner (Overall Athletic Excellence): Sidwell Friends School

2017-2018 Conference Champions
Cross Country: Sidwell Friends School
Football: 
Golf: Maret School
Soccer:
Basketball:
Wrestling:
Baseball:
Lacrosse:
Tennis:
Track and Field:

2018-2019 Conference Champions
Cross Country: Sidwell Friends School
Football: Flint Hill School
Golf:
Soccer:
Basketball: Flint Hill School
Swimming & Diving:
Wrestling:
Baseball:
Lacrosse: St. Andrew's Episcopal School
Tennis: Sidwell Friends School
Track and Field: Sidwell Friends School

2021-2022 Conference Champions
Cross Country: Georgetown Day School
Football: St. James School
Golf:
Soccer:
Basketball: Sidwell Friends School
Swimming & Diving:
Wrestling:
Baseball:
Lacrosse: 
Tennis: 
Track and Field: 
2022-2023 Conference Champions
Cross Country: 
Football: 
Golf:
Soccer:
Basketball: Sidwell Friends School 
Swimming & Diving:
Wrestling:
Baseball:
Lacrosse:
Tennis:
Track and Field:

References

High school sports conferences and leagues in the United States